Joint Base Pearl Harbor–Hickam (JBPHH)  is a United States military base on the island of Oahu, Hawaii. It is an amalgamation of the United States Air Force's Hickam Air Force Base and the United States Navy's Naval Station Pearl Harbor, which were merged in 2010.

Joint Base Pearl Harbor–Hickam is one of 12 Joint Bases the 2005 Base Realignment and Closure Commission created.

It is part of Navy Region Hawaii and provides Navy and joint operations Base Operating Support that is capabilities-based and integrated.

Naval Station Pearl Harbor

Naval Station Pearl Harbor provides berthing and shore side support to surface ships and submarines, as well as maintenance and training. Pearl Harbor can accommodate the largest ships in the fleet, to include dry dock services, and is now home to over 160 commands. Housing, personnel, and family support are also provided and are an integral part of the shore side activities, which encompasses both permanent and transient personnel.

Because Pearl Harbor is the only intermediate maintenance facility for submarines in the Middle Pacific, it serves as host to a large number of visiting submariners.

The Naval Computer and Telecommunications Area Master Station Pacific, Wahiawa, Hawaii is the world's largest communication station.  The headquarters site of this shore command is located in the central section of the island of Oahu, approximately three miles north of Wahiawa.

Hickam Air Force Base

Hickam Air Force Base was named in honor of aviation pioneer Lt. Col. Horace Meek Hickam. It is under the jurisdiction of Pacific Air Forces (PACAF), which is headquartered on the base.

Hickam AFB remains the launch point of strategic air mobility and operational missions in support of the Global War on Terrorism as well as special air missions in support of the Commander, U.S. Pacific Command (USPACOM) and Commander, Pacific Air Forces (PACAF).

In 2009, the base was used as the temporary operating location for Air Force One during Barack Obama's Christmas vacation at Kailua, Hawaii.

Infrastructure
Wells access groundwater sources that provide water to the base system, which serves residents of military housing, the Aliamanu Military Reservation, and several elementary schools and day care centers.

Based Units

United States Navy 
Commander, Navy Installations Command (CNIC)
 Commander, Navy Region Hawaii (NAVREGHI) (Host Unit)

United States Pacific Fleet (USPACFLT)
 Commander, US Pacific Fleet (COMUSPACFLT)
 Commander, Submarine Force, U.S. Pacific Fleet (COMSUBPAC)
 Commander, Submarine Squadron One (COMSUBRON 1)
 
 
 
 
 
 
 Commander, Submarine Squadron Seven (COMSUBRON 7)
 
 
 
 
 
 
 Commander, Naval Surface Force Pacific (COMNAVSURFPAC)
 Commander, Surface Group Middle Pacific (COMNAVSURFGRUMIDPAC) (GSU)
 
 Commander, Destroyer Squadron 31 (COMDESRON 31)
 
 
 
 
 
 Afloat Training Group Middle Pacific (AFLOATRAGRUMIDPAC) (GSU)

Naval Facilities Engineering Systems Command (NAVFAC)
 Naval Facilities Engineering Systems Command Pacific (NAVFAC Pacific) (GSU)
 Naval Facilities Engineering Systems Command Hawaii (NAVFACHI)

Naval Information Forces (NAVIFOR)
 Naval Computer and Telecommunications Area Master Station Pacific (NCTAMS PAC) (GSU)
 Naval Information Operations Command Hawaii (NIOC HI)(GSU)
 Commander, Task Force 1070 (CTF-1070)

Naval Sea Systems Command (NAVSEA)
 Pearl Harbor Naval Shipyard (PHNSY & IMF)
 Mobile Diving and Salvage Unit One (MDSU 1)

Naval Supply Systems Command (NAVSUP)
 Naval Supply Fleet Logistics Center Pearl Harbor (GSU)

Bureau of Medicine and Surgery (BUMED)
 Navy Medicine Readiness and Training Command - Pearl Harbor (NMRTC) (GSU)
 Naval Health Clinic Hawaii (NHCH)

Naval Education and Training Command (NETC)
 Surface Warfare Schools Command (SWSC)
 SWSC Learning Site Pearl Harbor

United States Navy Reserve (USNR)
 Navy Reserve Center - Pearl Harbor

United States Air Force 

Pacific Air Forces (PACAF)
 Headquarters Pacific Air Forces
 613th Air Operations Center
 Eleventh Air Force
 15th Wing
 15th Wing Staff Agencies
 15th Comptroller Squadron
 15th Operations Group
 535th Airlift Squadron - Boeing C-17A Globemaster III
 65th Airlift Squadron - Gulfstream Aerospace C-37B Gulfstream G550
 19th Fighter Squadron - Lockheed Martin F-22A Raptor
 15th Operations Support Squadron
 15th Maintenance Group
 15th Maintenance Squadron
 15th Aircraft Maintenance Squadron
 647th Air Base Group
 647th Civil Engineer Squadron
 647th Force Support Squadron
 647th Logistics Readiness Squadron
 647th Security Forces Squadron
 747th Cyberspace Squadron
 15th Medical Group
 15th Healthcare Operations Squadron
 15th Medical Support Squadron
 15th Operational Medical Readiness Squadron

Air Combat Command (ACC)
 Sixteenth Air Force
 688th Cyberspace Wing
 690th Cyberspace Operations Group
 690th Cyberspace Operations Squadron (GSU)
 480th Intelligence, Surveillance and Reconnaissance Wing
 692nd Intelligence, Surveillance and Reconnaissance Group (GSU)
 8th Intelligence Squadron
 324th Intelligence Squadron
 392nd Intelligence Squadron
 792nd Intelligence Support Squadron
 557th Weather Wing
 1st Weather Group
 17th Operational Weather Squadron (GSU)
 70th Intelligence, Surveillance and Reconnaissance Wing
 543rd Intelligence, Surveillance and Reconnaissance Group
 37th Intelligence Squadron (GSU)

Air Mobility Command (AMC)
 United States Air Force Expeditionary Center
 515th Air Mobility Operations Wing (GSU)
 Headquarters, 515th Air Mobility Operations Wing
 735th Air Mobility Operations Squadron

Air Force Materiel Command (AFMC)
 Air Force Installation and Mission Support Center
 Detachment 2 (GSU)

Air Force Reserve Command (AFRC)
 Fourth Air Force
 624th Regional Support Group (GSU)
 624th Civil Engineer Squadron
 48th Aerial Port Squadron
 624th Aeromedical Staging Squadron
 624th Force Support Flight

Air National Guard (ANG)
 Hawaii Air National Guard
 154th Wing
 154th Wing Staff Agencies
 154th Comptroller Flight
 154th Operations Group
 199th Fighter Squadron - Lockheed Martin F-22A Raptor
 203rd Air Refueling Squadron - Boeing KC-135R Stratotanker
 204th Airlift Squadron - Boeing C-17A Globemaster III
 201st Intelligence Squadron
 154th Operations Support Squadron
 154th Maintenance Group
 154th Maintenance Squadron
 154th Aircraft Maintenance Squadron
 154th Maintenance Operations Flight
 154th Mission Support Group
 154th Security Forces Squadron
 154th Communications Squadron
 154th Force Support Squadron
 154th Logistics Readiness Squadron
 154th Medical Group
 201st Air Operations Group
 201st Combat Operations Squadron
 201st Air Mobility Operations Squadron

Civil Air Patrol
 Pacific Region
 Hawaii Wing
 Hickam Composite Squadron (PCR-HI-066) (GSU)

United States Space Force 
 United States Space Forces Indo-Pacific (SPACEFORINDOPAC)
 Headquarters U.S. Space Forces Indo-Pacific

United States Army 
94th Army Air and Missile Defense Command (94th AAMDC)
 Headquarters Battery 
8th Theater Sustainment Command (8th TSC)
 8th Special Troops Battalion -  &  
 545th Transportation Company
 545th Harbormaster Detachment (GSU) - 
 130th Engineer Brigade
 65th Engineer Battalion
 7th Engineer Dive Detachment (GSU)
Regional Health Command-Pacific
 Public Health Command-Pacific
 Public Health Activity - Hawaii
 Joint Base Pearl Harbor–Hickam Veterinary Treatment Facility (GSU)
United States Army Reserve
 657th Area Support Group
 548th Transportation Detachment (GSU) 
 US Army Reserve Element, Defense Logistics Agency Pacific Center

US Department of Defense 
US Indo-Pacific Command (USINDOPACOM)
 Joint Intelligence Operations Center Pacific
 Center for Excellence in Disaster Management and Humanitarian Assistance
 K. Mark Takai Warfighting Center

Defense Logistics Agency (DLA)
 Defense Logistics Agency - Indo-Pacific
 Distribution Center - Pearl Harbor
 Disposition Services - Joint Base Pearl Harbor–Hickam

Defense Information Systems Agency (DISA)
 Defense Information Systems Agency - Pacific Field Office (DISA-PAC)

Defense POW/MIA Accounting Agency (DPAA)
 Defense POW/MIA Accounting Agency - Indo-Pacific
 Sub Regional Team One
 Sub Regional Team Two
 Operations & Accounting Support Division
 Defense POW/MIA Accounting Agency - Expeditionary Support
 Alpha Section
 Bravo Section
 Charlie Section
 Delta Section
 World-wide Operations Center
 DPAA Academy

National Oceanic and Atmospheric Administration 
 Office of Marine and Avionics Operations
 Marine Operations Center - Pacific Islands (GSU)

Gallery

See also
 Pearl Harbor attack
 Red Hill water crisis
 HABS/HAER documentation of Pearl Harbor Naval Base for a listing of the very extensive documentation of Pearl Harbor Naval Base by the Historic American Buildings Survey and the Historic American Engineering Record
 HABS/HAER documentation of Hickam Air Force Base for a listing of the documentation of Hickam Air Force Base by the Historic American Buildings Survey

Notes

References

 Mueller, Robert (1989). Active Air Force Bases Within the United States of America on 17 September 1982. USAF Reference Series. Maxwell AFB, Alabama: Office of Air Force History. .
 Rogers, Brian (2005). United States Air Force Unit Designations Since 1978. Hinkley, England: Midland Publications. .

External links

 

Joint bases of the U.S. Department of Defense
Military installations in Hawaii
2010 establishments in Hawaii
Pearl Harbor
Military installations established in 2010